William Henry Corbett (July 6, 1847 – November 25, 1941) was a farmer and political figure in Manitoba. He represented Springfield from 1903 to 1907 in the Legislative Assembly of Manitoba as a Conservative.

Early life and career
He was born in Cavan, Ontario and came to Winnipeg, Manitoba in 1871. He settled in Springfield and served as reeve for the Rural Municipality of Springfield for 14 years. Corbett married Jennie Wright.

Death
He died at home in Winnipeg in 1941.

Personal life
His son Albert also served in the Manitoba assembly.

References 

1847 births
1941 deaths
Progressive Conservative Party of Manitoba MLAs